Puente Transbordador (also known as Buenos Aires Transporter Bridge, Puente Transbordador de La Boca  Puente Transbordador Nicolás Avellaneda, Antiguo Puente Nicolás Avellaneda or Transbordador del Riachuelo ) is a transporter bridge in Buenos Aires, Argentina. The bridge was in use from its completion in 1914 until 1960, when operation ceased until 2017. Since 1999 the bridge is a National Historic Monument of Argentina.

The transporter bridge was the first link to connect Buenos Aires with the outskirts on the other side of the Riachuelo River. The bridge links the Avenida La Plata in the neighbourhood Island Maciel of Dock Sud with Avenida Almirante Brown in the La Boca neighbourhood of Buenos Aires.

The name of the bridge refers to Nicolás Avellaneda, a former president of Argentina, who also gave the name to the Avellaneda Partido on the right bank of the river.

The platform of the transporter bridge measured 8 by 12 metres and could be operated from a control stand on itself or from the machine house. It was designed to carry pedestrians, carts, cars and trams.

History
On September 25, 1908 the Buenos Aires Great Southern Railway was authorised to build a transporter bridge uniting the city of Buenos Aires with Buenos Aires Province south of the Riachuelo River. Buenos Aires Province bore all the costs of the bridge despite it also serving the Argentinian capital.

The transporter bridge was inaugurated May 31, 1914 and operated until 1960. The Puente Nicolás Avellaneda road bridge (just 100 metres away), was constructed in 1940.

In 1997, plans were announced to restore the bridge at a cost of US$1.2 million. The bridge was slated to resume operation on Thursday 28 September 2017.

In September 2017, the bridge was finally restored and reopened to the public for the first time in 57 years.

Gallery

References

External links

 
 Puente Transbordador de La Boca in Todos Buenos Aires 
 Transbordador del Riachuelo on the official site of Buenos Aires Government  
 Puente Transbordador de La Boca historical photos 

Transporter bridges
Bridges in Argentina
Bridges completed in 1914